The 1814–15 United States House of Representatives elections were held on various dates in various states between April 26, 1814 and August 10, 1815. Each state set its own date for its elections to the House of Representatives before the first session of the 14th United States Congress convened on December 4, 1815. They occurred during President James Madison's second term. Elections were held for all 182 seats, representing 18 states.

This election happened in the middle of the War of 1812. The war was extremely unpopular in certain regions, particularly New England. The failed American invasion of Upper Canada (Ontario) and the 1814 Burning of Washington were embarrassing military setbacks, but the Democratic-Republican Party remained dominant and the declining Federalist Party was unable to convert war opposition into political gain.

This election marked the first in American history where the incumbent president's party gained House seats in a midterm election while still losing seats in the Senate, this happened again in 1822 and 1902.

Election summaries

Special elections 

There were special elections in 1814 and 1815 to the 13th United States Congress and 14th United States Congress.

Special elections are sorted by date then district.

13th Congress 

|-
! 
| Henry Clay
|  | Democratic-Republican
| 1810
|  | Incumbent resigned January 19, 1814 to travel to Europe for the War of 1812 negotiations.New member elected February 28, 1814.Democratic-Republican hold.Successor seated March 29, 1814.Successor was not later a candidate for re-election, see below.
| nowrap | 

|-
! 
| William M. Richardson
|  | Democratic-Republican
| 1811 
|  | Incumbent resigned April 18, 1814.New member elected May 23, 1814.Democratic-Republican hold.Successor later re-elected to the next term, see below.Successor seated September 22, 1814.
| nowrap | 

|-
! 
| John Dawson
|  | Democratic-Republican
| 1797
|  | Incumbent died March 31, 1814.New member elected June 1814.Democratic-Republican hold.Successor was later re-elected, see below.Successor seated January 11, 1815.
| nowrap | 

|-
! 
| Daniel Dewey
|  | Federalist
| 1812
|  | Incumbent resigned February 24, 1814, to become associate judge of the Massachusetts Supreme Judicial Court.New member elected August 4, 1814.Federalist hold.Successor was later re-elected, see below.Successor seated September 26, 1814.
| nowrap | 

|-
! 
| Samuel Smith
|  | Federalist
| 1812
|  | Incumbent resigned May 21, 1814.In the August 29, 1814 special election, no candidate received the required majority to be elected. The seat appears to have been left vacant for the remainder of the Congress.Federalist loss.
| nowrap | 

|-
! 
| Felix Grundy
|  | Democratic-Republican
| 1811
|  | Incumbent resigned in 1814.New member elected September 15–16, 1814.Democratic-Republican hold.Successor later re-elected to the next term, see below.Successor seated October 15, 1814.
| nowrap | 

|-
! 
| Jacob Hufty
|  | Federalist
| 1808
|  | Incumbent died May 20, 1814.New member elected October 10–11, 1814.Democratic-Republican gain.By the time of the special election the legislature had reinstated at-large elections. This was the second of three cases when the special election was held on a different basis than the general election.Successor was not a candidate that same day for election to the next term, see below.Successor seated November 2, 1814.
| nowrap | 

|-
! 
| Edward Hempstead
|  | Democratic-Republican
| 1812 
| Incumbent served until September 17, 1814.New delegate elected September 17, 1814.Successor also elected to the next term, see below.Successor seated November 16, 1814.
| nowrap | 

|-
! 
| Reasin Beall
|  | Democratic-Republican
| 1813 
|  | Incumbent resigned June 7, 1814.New member elected.Democratic-Republican hold.New member elected October 11, 1814.Successor also elected the same day to the next term, see below.Successor seated December 22, 1814.
| nowrap | 

|-
! 
| Jonathan Roberts
|  | Democratic-Republican
| 1810
|  | Incumbent resigned February 24, 1814, when elected U.S. Senator.New member elected October 11, 1814.Federalist gain.Successor lost election, the same day, to the next term, see below.Successor seated November 29, 1814.
| nowrap | 

|-
! 
| James Whitehill
|  | Democratic-Republican
| 1812
|  | Incumbent resigned September 1, 1814, to engage in mercantile pursuits.New member elected October 12, 1814.Federalist gain.Successor elected, the next day, to the next term, see below.Successor seated December 12, 1814.
| nowrap | 

|}

14th Congress 

|-
! 
| Daniel A. White
|  | Federalist
| 1814
|  | Member-elect declined the seat to become Probate Judge in Essex County.New member elected July 17, 1815.Federalist hold.Successor seated December 4, 1815.
| nowrap | 

|-
! 
| Jonathan Fisk
|  | Democratic-Republican
| 18081810 1812
|  | Incumbent resigned in March 1815 when appointed U.S. Attorney for the Southern District of New York.New member elected in April 1815.Democratic-Republican hold.Successor seated December 4, 1815.
| nowrap | 

|-
! 
| Benjamin Pond
|  | Democratic-Republican
| 1810
|  | Incumbent died October 14, 1814.New member elected in April 1815.Democratic-Republican hold.Successor seated December 7, 1815.
| nowrap | 

|-
! 
| Matthew Clay
|  | Democratic-Republican
| 17971812 1815
|  | Incumbent died May 27, 1815.New member elected in October 1815.Democratic-Republican hold.Successor seated December 5, 1815.
| nowrap | 

|-
! 
| Jonathan Williams
|  | Democratic-Republican
| 1814
|  | Incumbent died May 16, 1815.New member elected October 10, 1815.Federalist gain.Successor seated December 6, 1815.
| nowrap | 

|-
! 
| Amos Ellmaker
|  | Democratic-Republican
| 1814 
|  | Incumbent resigned July 3, 1815 to become President Judge of the 12th Judicial District.New member elected October 10, 1815.Democratic-Republican hold.Successor seated December 4, 1815.
| nowrap | 

|-
! 
| David Bard
|  | Democratic-Republican
| 17941798 1802
|  | Incumbent died March 12, 1815.New member elected October 10, 1815.Democratic-Republican hold.Successor seated December 11, 1815.
| nowrap | 

|-
! 
| Henry Clay
|  | Democratic-Republican
| 18101814 1814
|  | Seat declared vacant in 1815 by the governor, “caused by the acceptance of Henry Clay to sign a commercial convention as minister plenipotentiary to Great Britain.”Incumbent re-elected October 30, 1815 to fill his own vacancy.Democratic-Republican hold.Successor seated December 4, 1815.
| nowrap | 

|-
! 
| John Sevier
|  | Democratic-Republican
| 1790 (in North Carolina)1790 1811
|  | Incumbent died September 24, 1815.New member elected December 7–8, 1815.Democratic-Republican hold.Successor seated January 8, 1816.
| nowrap | 

|}

Connecticut 

Connecticut held its election September 19, 1814.

|- style="height:4em"
! rowspan=7 | 
| Epaphroditus Champion
|  | Federalist
| 1806
| Incumbent re-elected.
| rowspan=7 nowrap | 

|- style="height:4em"
| John Davenport
|  | Federalist
| 1798
| Incumbent re-elected.

|- style="height:4em"
| Lyman Law
|  | Federalist
| 1810
| Incumbent re-elected.

|- style="height:4em"
| Jonathan O. Moseley
|  | Federalist
| 1804
| Incumbent re-elected.

|- style="height:4em"
| Benjamin Tallmadge
|  | Federalist
| 1801 
| Incumbent re-elected.

|- style="height:4em"
| Timothy Pitkin
|  | Federalist
| 1805 
| Incumbent re-elected.

|-
| Lewis B. Sturges
|  | Federalist
| 1805 
| Incumbent re-elected.

|}

Delaware 

Delaware held its election October 4, 1814.

|-
! rowspan=2 | 
| Henry M. Ridgely
|  | Federalist
| 1810
|  | Incumbent retired.New member elected.Federalist hold.
| rowspan=2 nowrap | 

|-
| Thomas Cooper
|  | Federalist
| 1812
| Incumbent re-elected.

|}

Georgia 

Georgia held its election October 3, 1814.

|-
! rowspan=6 | 
| John Forsyth
|  | Democratic-Republican
| 1812
| Incumbent re-elected.
| rowspan=6 nowrap | 

|-
| Alfred Cuthbert
|  | Democratic-Republican
| 1813 
| Incumbent re-elected.

|-
| George M. Troup
|  | Democratic-Republican
| 1806
|  | Incumbent retired.New member elected.Democratic-Republican hold.

|-
| William Barnett
|  | Democratic-Republican
| 1812 
|  | Incumbent lost re-election.New member elected.Democratic-Republican hold.

|-
| Bolling Hall
|  | Democratic-Republican
| 1810
| Incumbent re-elected.

|-
| Thomas Telfair
|  | Democratic-Republican
| 1812
| Incumbent re-elected.

|}

Illinois Territory 
See Non-voting delegates, below.

Indiana Territory 
See Non-voting delegates, below.

Kentucky 

Kentucky held its elections August 3, 1814.

|-
! 
| James Clark
|  | Democratic-Republican
| 1812
| Incumbent re-elected.
| nowrap | 

|-
! 
| Joseph H. Hawkins
|  | Democratic-Republican
| 1814 
|  | Incumbent retired.New member elected.Democratic-Republican hold.
| nowrap | 

|-
! 
| Richard M. Johnson
|  | Democratic-Republican
| 1806
| Incumbent re-elected.
| nowrap | 

|-
! 
| Joseph Desha
|  | Democratic-Republican
| 1806
| Incumbent re-elected.
| nowrap | 

|-
! 
| Samuel Hopkins
|  | Democratic-Republican
| 1812
|  | Incumbent retired.New member elected.Democratic-Republican hold.
| nowrap | 

|-
! 
| Solomon P. Sharp
|  | Democratic-Republican
| 1812
| Incumbent re-elected.
| nowrap | 

|-
! 
| Samuel McKee
|  | Democratic-Republican
| 1808
| Incumbent re-elected.
| nowrap | 

|-
! 
| Stephen Ormsby
|  | Democratic-Republican
| 1810
| Incumbent re-elected.
| nowrap | 

|-
! 
| Thomas Montgomery
|  | Democratic-Republican
| 1812
|  | Incumbent lost re-election.New member elected.Democratic-Republican hold.
| nowrap | 

|-
! 
| William P. Duval
|  | Democratic-Republican
| 1812
|  | Incumbent retired.New member elected.Democratic-Republican hold.
| nowrap | 

|}

Louisiana 

Louisiana held its election July 4–6, 1814.

|-
! 
| Thomas B. Robertson
|  | Democratic-Republican
| 1812
| Incumbent re-elected.
| nowrap | 

|}

Maryland 

Maryland held its elections October 3, 1814.

|-
! 
| Philip Stuart
|  | Federalist
| 1810
| Incumbent re-elected.
| nowrap | 

|-
! 
| Joseph Kent
|  | Democratic-Republican
| 1810
|  | Incumbent lost re-election.New member elected.Federalist gain.
| nowrap | 

|-
! 
| Alexander C. Hanson
|  | Federalist
| 1812
| Incumbent re-elected.
| nowrap | 

|-
! 
| Samuel Ringgold
|  | Democratic-Republican
| 1810
|  | Incumbent lost re-election.New member elected.Federalist gain.
| nowrap | 

|-
! rowspan=2 | 
| Nicholas R. Moore
|  | Democratic-Republican
| 18031810 1812
| Incumbent re-elected.
| rowspan=2 nowrap | 

|-
| Alexander McKim
|  | Democratic-Republican
| 1808
|  | Incumbent retired.New member elected.Democratic-Republican hold.

|-
! 
| Stevenson Archer
|  | Democratic-Republican
| 1811 
| Incumbent re-elected.
| nowrap | 

|-
! 
| Robert Wright
|  | Democratic-Republican
| 1810 
| Incumbent re-elected.
| nowrap | 

|-
! 
| Charles Goldsborough
|  | Federalist
| 1804
| Incumbent re-elected.
| nowrap | 

|}

Massachusetts 

Massachusetts held its elections November 7, 1814.  State law required a majority vote for election which was not met in two districts, leading to a second election January 6, 1815.

District numbers differed between source used and elsewhere on Wikipedia; district numbers used elsewhere on Wikipedia used here.

|-
! 
| Artemas Ward Jr.
|  | Federalist
| 1812
| Incumbent re-elected.
| nowrap | 

|-
! 
| Timothy Pickering
|  | Federalist
| 1812
| Incumbent re-elected.
| nowrap | 

|-
! 
| William Reed
|  | Federalist
| 1810
|  | Incumbent retired.New member elected.Federalist hold.Successor declined the seat before Congress convened, leading to a special election.
| nowrap | 

|-
! 
| Samuel Dana
|  | Democratic-Republican
| 1814 
|  | Incumbent lost re-election.New member elected.Federalist gain.
| nowrap | 

|-
! 
| William Ely
|  | Federalist
| 1804
|  | Incumbent retired.New member elected.Federalist hold.
| nowrap | 

|-
! 
| Samuel Taggart
|  | Federalist
| 1803
| Incumbent re-elected.
| nowrap | 

|-
! 
| John W. Hulbert
|  | Federalist
| 1812
| Incumbent re-elected.
| nowrap | 

|-
! 
| William Baylies
|  | Federalist
| 1812
| Incumbent re-elected.
| nowrap | 

|-
! 
| John Reed Jr.
|  | Federalist
| 1812
| Incumbent re-elected.
| nowrap | 

|-
! 
| Laban Wheaton
|  | Federalist
| 1808
| Incumbent re-elected.
| nowrap | 

|-
! 
| Elijah Brigham
|  | Federalist
| 1810
| Incumbent re-elected.
| nowrap | 

|-
! 
| Abijah Bigelow
|  | Federalist
| 1810
|  | Incumbent retired.New member elected.Federalist hold.
| nowrap | 

|-
! 
| Nathaniel Ruggles
|  | Federalist
| 1812
| Incumbent re-elected.
| nowrap | 

|-
! 
| Cyrus King
|  | Federalist
| 1812
| Incumbent re-elected.
| nowrap | 

|-
! 
| George Bradbury
|  | Federalist
| 1812
| Incumbent re-elected.
| nowrap | 

|-
! 
| Abiel Wood
|  | Democratic-Republican
| 1812
|  | Incumbent lost re-election.New member elected.Federalist gain.
| nowrap | 

|-
! 
| John Wilson
|  | Federalist
| 1812
|  | Incumbent lost re-election.New member elected.Democratic-Republican gain.
| First ballot :John Wilson (Federalist) 49.3%James Carr (Federalist) 48.3%Others 2.4%Second ballot :nowrap | 

|-
! 
| James Parker
|  | Democratic-Republican
| 1813
|  | Incumbent lost re-election.New member elected.Federalist gain.
| nowrap | 

|-
! 
| Samuel Davis
|  | Federalist
| 1812
|  | Incumbent lost re-election.New member elected.Democratic-Republican gain.
| First ballot :Samuel S. Conner (Democratic-Republican) 49.3%Timothy Boutelle (Federalist) 48.8%William Reed (Democratic-Republican) 1.5%Others 0.4%Second ballot :nowrap | 

|-
! 
| Levi Hubbard
|  | Democratic-Republican
| 1812
|  | Incumbent retired.New member elected.Democratic-Republican hold.
| nowrap | 

|}

Mississippi Territory 
See Non-voting delegates, below.

Missouri Territory 
See Non-voting delegates, below.

New Hampshire 

New Hampshire held its election August 29, 1814.

|-
! rowspan=6 | 
| William Hale
|  | Federalist
| 18081810 1812
| Incumbent re-elected.
| rowspan=6 nowrap | 

|-
| Daniel Webster
|  | Federalist
| 1812
| Incumbent re-elected.

|-
| Roger Vose
|  | Federalist
| 1812
| Incumbent re-elected.

|-
| Jeduthun Wilcox
|  | Federalist
| 1812
| Incumbent re-elected.

|-
| Bradbury Cilley
|  | Federalist
| 1812
| Incumbent re-elected.

|-
| Samuel Smith
|  | Federalist
| 1812
|  | Incumbent resigned May 21, 1814.New member elected.Federalist hold.

|}

New Jersey 

New Jersey held its election October 10–11, 1814. The state returned to an at-large basis for electing its representatives, abolishing the short-lived districts of the previous election.

|-
! rowspan=6 | 
| Jacob Hufty
|  | Federalist
| 1808
|  | Incumbent died May 20, 1814.New member elected.Democratic-Republican gain.Successor was not a candidate that same day to finish the term, see above.
| rowspan=6 nowrap | 

|-
| Lewis Condict
|  | Democratic-Republican
| 1810
| Incumbent re-elected.

|-
| James Schureman
|  | Federalist
| 17891798 1813
|  | Incumbent retired.New member elected.Democratic-Republican gain.

|-
| Richard Stockton
|  | Federalist
| 1813
|  | Incumbent retired.New member elected.Democratic-Republican gain.

|-
| William Coxe Jr.
|  | Federalist
| 1813
|  | Incumbent retired.New member elected.Democratic-Republican gain.

|-
| Thomas Ward
|  | Democratic-Republican
| 1813
| Incumbent re-elected.

|}

New York 

New York held its elections April 26–28, 1814.

|-
! rowspan=2 | 
| Ebenezer Sage
|  | Democratic-Republican
| 1810
|  | Incumbent retired.New member elected.Democratic-Republican hold.
| rowspan=2 nowrap | 

|-
| John Lefferts
|  | Democratic-Republican
| 1812
|  | Incumbent retired.New member elected.Democratic-Republican hold.

|-
! rowspan=2 | 
| William Irving
|  | Democratic-Republican
| 1813 
| Incumbent re-elected.
| rowspan=2 nowrap | 

|-
| Jotham Post Jr.
|  | Federalist
| 1812
|  | Incumbent retired.New member elected.Democratic-Republican gain.

|-
! 
| Peter Denoyelles
|  | Democratic-Republican
| 1812
|  | Incumbent retired.New member elected.Democratic-Republican hold.
| nowrap | 

|-
! 
| Thomas J. Oakley
|  | Federalist
| 1812
|  | Incumbent retired.New member elected.Democratic-Republican gain.
| nowrap | 

|-
! 
| Thomas P. Grosvenor
|  | Federalist
| 1812
| Incumbent re-elected.
| nowrap | 

|-
! 
| Jonathan Fisk
|  | Democratic-Republican
| 1812
| Incumbent re-elected.Incumbent resigned at the beginning of the term, triggering a special election.
| nowrap | 

|-
! 
| Abraham J. Hasbrouck
|  | Democratic-Republican
| 1812
|  | Incumbent retired.New member elected.Democratic-Republican hold.
| nowrap | 

|-
! 
| Samuel Sherwood
|  | Federalist
| 1812
|  | Incumbent retired.New member elected.Federalist hold.Loser successfully challenged the election.

| nowrap | 

|-
! 
| John Lovett
|  | Federalist
| 1812
| Incumbent re-elected.
| nowrap | 

|-
! 
| Hosea Moffitt
|  | Federalist
| 1812
| Incumbent re-elected.
| nowrap | 

|-
! 
| John W. Taylor
|  | Democratic-Republican
| 1812
| Incumbent re-elected.
| nowrap | 

|-
! rowspan=2 | 
| Zebulon R. Shipherd
|  | Federalist
| 1812
|  | Incumbent lost re-election.New member elected.Democratic-Republican gain.
| rowspan=2 nowrap | 

|-
| Elisha I. Winter
|  | Federalist
| 1812
|  | Incumbent lost re-election.New member elected.Democratic-Republican gain.Successor died before the next term began, triggering a special election.

|-
! 
| Alexander Boyd
|  | Federalist
| 1812
|  | Incumbent retired.New member elected.Democratic-Republican gain.
| nowrap | 

|-
! 
| Jacob Markell
|  | Federalist
| 1812
|  | Incumbent retired.New member elected.Federalist hold.
| nowrap | 

|-
! rowspan=2 | 
| Isaac Williams Jr.
|  | Democratic-Republican
| 1813 
|  | Incumbent retired.New member elected.Democratic-Republican hold.
| rowspan=2 nowrap | 

|-
| Joel Thompson
|  | Federalist
| 1812
|  | Incumbent retired.New member elected.Democratic-Republican gain.

|-
! 
| Morris S. Miller
|  | Federalist
| 1812
|  | Incumbent retired.New member elected.Federalist hold.
| nowrap | 

|-
! 
| William S. Smith
|  | Federalist
| 1812
| Incumbent re-elected.Loser successfully challenged the election.
| nowrap | 

|-
! 
| Moss Kent
|  | Federalist
| 1812
| Incumbent re-elected.
| nowrap | 

|-
! 
| James Geddes
|  | Federalist
| 1812
|  | Incumbent lost re-election.New member elected.Democratic-Republican gain.
| nowrap | 

|-
! rowspan=2 | 
| Daniel Avery
|  | Democratic-Republican
| 1810
|  | Incumbent retired.New member elected.Democratic-Republican hold.
| rowspan=2 nowrap | 

|-
| Oliver C. Comstock
|  | Democratic-Republican
| 1812
| Incumbent re-elected.

|-
! rowspan=2 | 
| Samuel M. Hopkins
|  | Federalist
| 1812
|  | Incumbent retired.New member elected.Democratic-Republican gain.
| rowspan=2 nowrap | 

|-
| Nathaniel W. Howell
|  | Federalist
| 1812
|  | Incumbent retired.New member elected.Democratic-Republican gain.

|}

North Carolina 

North Carolina held its elections August 10, 1815.

|-
! 
| William H. Murfree
|  | Democratic-Republican
| 1813
| Incumbent re-elected.
| nowrap | 

|-
! 
| Willis Alston
|  | Democratic-Republican
| 1798
|  | Incumbent retired.New member elected.Democratic-Republican hold.
| nowrap | 

|-
! 
| William Kennedy
|  | Democratic-Republican
| 18031810 1813 
|  | Incumbent retired.New member elected.Democratic-Republican hold.
| nowrap | 

|-
! 
| William Gaston
|  | Federalist
| 1813
| Incumbent re-elected.
| nowrap | 

|-
! 
| William R. King
|  | Democratic-Republican
| 1810
| Incumbent re-elected.
| nowrap | 

|-
! 
| Nathaniel Macon
|  | Democratic-Republican
| 1791
| Incumbent re-elected.
| nowrap | 

|-
! 
| John Culpepper
|  | Federalist
| 18061808 (Contested election)1808 1813
| Incumbent re-elected.
| nowrap | 

|-
! 
| Richard Stanford
|  | Democratic-Republican
| 1796
| Incumbent re-elected.
| nowrap | 

|-
! 
| Bartlett Yancey
|  | Democratic-Republican
| 1813
| Incumbent re-elected.
| nowrap | 

|-
! 
| Joseph Pearson
|  | Federalist
| 1808
|  | Incumbent lost re-election.New member elected.Democratic-Republican gain.
| nowrap | 

|-
! 
| Peter Forney
|  | Democratic-Republican
| 1813
|  | Incumbent retired.New member elected.Democratic-Republican hold.
| nowrap | 

|-
! 
| Israel Pickens
|  | Democratic-Republican
| 1810
| Incumbent re-elected.
| nowrap | 

|-
! 
| Meshack Franklin
|  | Democratic-Republican
| 1806
|  | Incumbent lost re-election.New member elected.Democratic-Republican hold.
| nowrap | 

|}

Ohio 

Ohio held its elections October 11, 1814.

|-
! 
| John McLean
|  | Democratic-Republican
| 1812
| Incumbent re-elected.
| nowrap | 

|-
! 
| John Alexander
|  | Democratic-Republican
| 1812
| Incumbent re-elected.
| nowrap | 

|-
! 
| William Creighton Jr.
|  | Democratic-Republican
| 1813 
| Incumbent re-elected.
| nowrap | 

|-
! 
| James Caldwell
|  | Democratic-Republican
| 1812
| Incumbent re-elected.
| nowrap | 

|-
! 
| James Kilbourne
|  | Democratic-Republican
| 1812
| Incumbent re-elected.
| nowrap | 

|-
! 
| Reasin Beall
|  | Democratic-Republican
| 1813 
|  | Incumbent resigned June 7, 1814.New member elected.Democratic-Republican hold.Successor also elected the same day to finish the current term.
| nowrap | 

|}

Pennsylvania 

Pennsylvania held its elections October 11, 1814.

|-
! rowspan=4 | 
| Adam Seybert
|  | Democratic-Republican
| 1809 
|  | Incumbent lost re-election.New member elected.Federalist gain.
| rowspan=4 nowrap | 
|-
| William Anderson
|  | Democratic-Republican
| 1808
|  | Incumbent lost re-election.New member elected.Federalist gain.
|-
| Charles J. Ingersoll
|  | Democratic-Republican
| 1812
|  | Incumbent lost re-election.New member elected.Federalist gain.
|-
| John Conard
|  | Democratic-Republican
| 1812
|  | Incumbent lost re-election.New member elected.Federalist gain.

|-
! rowspan=2 | 
| Roger Davis
|  | Democratic-Republican
| 1810
|  | Incumbent retired.New member elected.Democratic-Republican hold.
| rowspan=2 nowrap | 
|-
| Jonathan Roberts
|  | Democratic-Republican
| 1810
|  | Incumbent resigned February 24, 1814, when elected U.S. Senator.New member elected.Democratic-Republican hold.Successor was not elected to finish the current term.

|-
! rowspan=2 | 
| James Whitehill
|  | Democratic-Republican
| 1812
|  | Incumbent resigned September 1, 1814, to engage in mercantile pursuits.New member elected.Democratic-Republican hold.Successor had been elected, the previous day, to finish the current term.
| rowspan=2 nowrap | 
|-
| Edward Crouch
|  | Democratic-Republican
| 1813 
|  | Incumbent retired.New member elected.Democratic-Republican hold.

|-
! 
| Hugh Glasgow
|  | Democratic-Republican
| 1812
| Incumbent re-elected.
| nowrap | 

|-
! rowspan=2 | 
| William Crawford
|  | Democratic-Republican
| 1808
| Incumbent re-elected.
| rowspan=2 nowrap | 
|-
| John Rea
|  | Democratic-Republican
| 1813 
|  | Incumbent retired.New member elected.Democratic-Republican hold.

|-
! rowspan=2 | 
| Samuel D. Ingham
|  | Democratic-Republican
| 1812
| Incumbent re-elected.
| rowspan=2 nowrap | 
|-
| Robert Brown
|  | Democratic-Republican
| 1798 
|  | Incumbent retired.New member elected.Democratic-Republican hold.

|-
! 
| Daniel Udree
|  | Democratic-Republican
| 1813 
|  | Incumbent lost re-election.New member elected.Democratic-Republican hold.
| nowrap | 

|-
! 
| William Piper
|  | Democratic-Republican
| 1810
| Incumbent re-elected.
| nowrap | 

|-
! 
| David Bard
|  | Democratic-Republican
| 1802
| Incumbent re-elected.
| nowrap | 

|-
! rowspan=2 | 
| Isaac Smith
|  | Democratic-Republican
| 1812
|  | Incumbent lost re-election.New member elected.Democratic-Republican hold.
| rowspan=2 nowrap | 
|-
| Jared Irwin
|  | Democratic-Republican
| 1812
| Incumbent re-elected.

|-
! 
| William Findley
|  | Democratic-Republican
| 1802
| Incumbent re-elected.
| nowrap | 

|-
! 
| Aaron Lyle
|  | Democratic-Republican
| 1808
| Incumbent re-elected.
| nowrap | 

|-
! 
| Isaac Griffin
|  | Democratic-Republican
| 1813 
| Incumbent re-elected.
| nowrap | 

|-
! 
| Adamson Tannehill
|  | Democratic-Republican
| 1812
|  | Incumbent lost re-election.New member elected.Federalist gain.
| nowrap | 

|-
! 
| Thomas Wilson
|  | Democratic-Republican
| 1813 
| Incumbent re-elected.
| nowrap | 

|}

Rhode Island 

Rhode Island held its election August 30, 1814.

|-
! rowspan=2 | 
| Richard Jackson Jr.
|  | Federalist
| 1808
|  | Incumbent retired.New member elected.Federalist hold.
| rowspan=2 nowrap | 

|-
| Elisha R. Potter
|  | Federalist
| 1808
|  | Incumbent retired.New member elected.Federalist hold.

|}

South Carolina 

South Carolina held its elections October 10–11, 1814.

|-
! 
| Langdon Cheves
|  | Democratic-Republican
| 1810
|  | Incumbent retired.New member elected.Democratic-Republican hold.
| nowrap | 

|-
! 
| William Lowndes
|  | Democratic-Republican
| 1810
| Incumbent re-elected.
| nowrap | 

|-
! 
| Theodore Gourdin
|  | Democratic-Republican
| 1812
|  | Incumbent lost re-election.New member elected.Federalist gain.
| nowrap | 

|-
! 
| John J. Chappell
|  | Democratic-Republican
| 1812
| Incumbent re-elected.
| nowrap | 

|-
! 
| David R. Evans
|  | Democratic-Republican
| 1812
|  | Incumbent retired.New member elected.Democratic-Republican hold.
| nowrap | 

|-
! 
| John C. Calhoun
|  | Democratic-Republican
| 1810
| Incumbent re-elected.
| nowrap | 

|-
! 
| Elias Earle
|  | Democratic-Republican
| 1805 1806 1810
|  | Incumbent lost re-election.New member elected.Democratic-Republican hold.
| nowrap | 

|-
! 
| Samuel Farrow
|  | Democratic-Republican
| 1812
|  | Incumbent retired.New member elected.Democratic-Republican hold.
| nowrap | 

|-
! 
| John Kershaw
|  | Democratic-Republican
| 1812
|  | Incumbent lost re-election.New member elected.Democratic-Republican hold.
| nowrap | 

|}

Tennessee 

Tennessee held its elections August 3–4, 1815.

|-
! 
| John Rhea
|  | Democratic-Republican
| 1803
|  | Incumbent lost re-election.New member elected.Democratic-Republican hold.
| nowrap | 

|-
! 
| John Sevier
|  | Democratic-Republican
| 1790 (in North Carolina)1790 1811
| Incumbent re-elected.
| nowrap | 

|-
! 
| Thomas K. Harris
|  | Democratic-Republican
| 1813
|  | Incumbent lost re-election.New member elected.Democratic-Republican hold.
| nowrap | 

|-
! 
| John H. Bowen
|  | Democratic-Republican
| 1813
|  | Incumbent retired.New member elected.Democratic-Republican hold.
| nowrap | 

|-
! 
| Newton Cannon
|  | Democratic-Republican
| 1814 
| Incumbent re-elected.
| nowrap | 

|-
! 
| Parry W. Humphreys
|  | Democratic-Republican
| 1813
|  | Incumbent retired.New member elected.Democratic-Republican hold.
| nowrap | 

|}

Vermont 

Vermont held its elections September 6, 1814. Voters swung from one party to the other.  The margins were close, actually, but to toss the entire six-member delegation out of office.

|-
! rowspan=6 | 
| William Czar Bradley
|  | Democratic-Republican
| 1812
|  | Incumbent lost re-election.New member elected.Federalist gain.
| rowspan=6 nowrap | 

|-
| William Strong
|  | Democratic-Republican
| 1810
|  | Incumbent lost re-election.New member elected.Federalist gain.

|-
| James Fisk
|  | Democratic-Republican
| 18051808 1810
|  | Incumbent lost re-election.Federalist gain.

|-
| Charles Rich
|  | Democratic-Republican
| 1812
|  | Incumbent lost re-election.New member elected.Federalist gain.

|-
| Richard Skinner
|  | Democratic-Republican
| 1812
|  | Incumbent lost re-election.New member elected.Federalist gain.

|-
| Ezra Butler
|  | Democratic-Republican
| 1812
|  | Incumbent lost re-election.New member elected.Federalist gain.

|}

Virginia 

Virginia held its elections in April 1815.

|-
! 
| John G. Jackson
|  | Democratic-Republican
| 18031810 1813
| Incumbent re-elected.
| nowrap | 

|-
! 
| Francis White
|  | Federalist
| 1813
|  | Incumbent lost re-election.New member elected.Federalist hold.
| nowrap | 

|-
! 
| John Smith
|  | Democratic-Republican
| 1801
|  | Incumbent retired.New member elected.Democratic-Republican hold.
| nowrap | 

|-
! 
| William McCoy
|  | Democratic-Republican
| 1811
| Incumbent re-elected.
| nowrap | 

|-
! 
| James Breckinridge
|  | Federalist
| 1809
| Incumbent re-elected.
| nowrap | 

|-
! 
| Daniel Sheffey
|  | Federalist
| 1809
| Incumbent re-elected.
| nowrap | 

|-
! 
| Hugh Caperton
|  | Federalist
| 1813
|  | Incumbent retired.New member elected.Democratic-Republican gain.
| nowrap | 

|-
! 
| Joseph Lewis Jr.
|  | Federalist
| 1803
| Incumbent re-elected.
| nowrap | 

|-
! 
| John P. Hungerford
|  | Democratic-Republican
| 1813
| Incumbent re-elected.
| nowrap | 

|-
! 
| Aylett Hawes
|  | Democratic-Republican
| 1811
| Incumbent re-elected.
| nowrap | 

|-
! 
| Philip P. Barbour
|  | Democratic-Republican
| 1814 
| Incumbent re-elected.
| nowrap | 

|-
! 
| John Roane
|  | Democratic-Republican
| 1809
|  | Incumbent retired.New member elected.Democratic-Republican hold.
| nowrap | 

|-
! 
| Thomas M. Bayly
|  | Federalist
| 1811
|  | Incumbent retired.New member elected.Democratic-Republican gain.
| nowrap | 

|-
! 
| William A. Burwell
|  | Democratic-Republican
| 1806 
| Incumbent re-elected.
| nowrap | 

|-
! 
| John Kerr
|  | Democratic-Republican
| 1813
|  | Incumbent lost re-election.New member elected.Democratic-Republican hold.
| nowrap | 

|-
! 
| John W. Eppes
|  | Democratic-Republican
| 18031811 1813
|  | Incumbent lost re-election.New member elected.Democratic-Republican hold.
| nowrap | 

|-
! 
| James Pleasants
|  | Democratic-Republican
| 1811
| Incumbent re-elected.
| nowrap | 

|-
! 
| Thomas Gholson Jr.
|  | Democratic-Republican
| 1808 
| Incumbent re-elected.
| nowrap | 

|-
! 
| Peterson Goodwyn
|  | Democratic-Republican
| 1803
| Incumbent re-elected.
| nowrap | 

|-
! 
| James Johnson
|  | Democratic-Republican
| 1813
| Incumbent re-elected.
| nowrap | 

|-
! 
| Thomas Newton Jr.
|  | Democratic-Republican
| 1797
| Incumbent re-elected.
| nowrap | 

|-
! 
| Hugh Nelson
|  | Democratic-Republican
| 1811
| Incumbent re-elected.
| nowrap | 

|-
! 
| John Clopton
|  | Democratic-Republican
| 1801
| Incumbent re-elected.
| nowrap | 

|}

Non-voting delegates 

Four territories sent delegates to the 14th Congress. There was no election held in Illinois Territory

|-
! 
| colspan=5 | No election held

|-
! 
| Jonathan Jennings
|  | Democratic-Republican
| 1809
| Incumbent re-elected.
| nowrap | 

|-
! 
| William Lattimore
|  | Democratic-Republican
| 18031807 1813
| Incumbent re-elected.
| nowrap | 

|-
! 
| Edward Hempstead
|  | Democratic-Republican
| 1812
|  | Incumbent retired.New delegate elected.Democratic-Republican hold.
| nowrap | 

|}

This was the last election for Indiana Territory, as it was admitted to the Union as a state in 1816. In Missouri Territory, Hempstead resigned and Easton also filled his seat for the remainder of the 13th Congress

See also
 1814 United States elections
 List of United States House of Representatives elections (1789–1822)
 1814–15 United States Senate elections

Notes

References

Bibliography

External links
 Office of the Historian (Office of Art & Archives, Office of the Clerk, U.S. House of Representatives)